One America in the 21st Century: The President's Initiative on Race , or the One America Initiative, was established by U.S. President Bill Clinton in 1997 with . The main thrust of the effort was convening and encouraging community dialogue throughout the country. The Advisory Board's principal legacy was the collection and publication of "best practices" for racial reconciliation and dialogue guidelines designed to help communities discuss how to address racial and ethnic divisions in mutually productive ways.

Commencement Speech, University of California San Diego

President Clinton introduced the initiative during his commencement speech to the graduating class of the university. In the speech, he discussed his own experience growing up in the segregated south and its profound effect on him. He addressed the continuing problems surrounding race in America and the need to find ways to solve them. Clinton envisioned an America based on equal opportunity, fairness, and respect for all as well as shared responsibility and a greater sense of civility. Clinton viewed race relations as something that too often divided and weakened the nation even as America was rapidly becoming the world's first truly-multiracial democracy. The Advisory Board, chaired by pre-eminent historian Dr. John Hope Franklin, was introduced to the audience as well.

Clinton identified three imperatives for the initiative to focus: expanding opportunity, demanding responsibility, and creating one American community based on respect and shared values. 

I want this panel to help educate Americans about the facts surrounding issues of race, to promote a dialogue in every community of the land to confront and work through these issues, to recruit and encourage leadership at all levels to help breach racial divides, and to find, develop and recommend how to implement concrete solutions to our problems -- solutions that will involve all of us in government, business, communities, and as individual citizens. 

Judith A. Winston served as Executive Director of the One America Initiative. Several other senior civil rights Presidential appointees and leaders in the national civil rights community served as senior staff for the Initiative.

Among models of diversity in schools, One America Initiative on Race focused on Fairfax County, Virginia, one of the most-culturally, linguistically-diverse school districts in the country.  The President's Advisory Board on Race commissioned a Case Study on a local Elementary School in Fairfax, Virginia and their Report "America in the 21st Century: Forging a New Future Report" quotes Linda Chavez-Thompson, about her visit to Bailey's Elementary School for the Arts and Sciences in December 1997 in her capacity as member of the Advisory Board on Race

Advisory board

Reports

See also 
Race relations

References

External links 
 
 
 
This article incorporates public domain material from 

1997 introductions
Clinton administration initiatives
1997 in American law
United States Presidential Commissions